Jung Jeong-Soo  (born November 20, 1969) is a South Korean footballer.

He graduated from Korea University. He was the K-League Top Assistor of 1998 season.

Honours

Player

Club
Ulsan Hyundai Horangi
 K-League Winners (1) : 1996

Individual
 K-League Top Assistor (1) : 1998
 K-League Best XI (1) : 1998

References

External links
 Jung Jeong-Soo Interview at KFA.com  

K League 1 players
K3 League players
Ulsan Hyundai FC players
Gyeongju Citizen FC players
South Korean footballers
1969 births
Living people
Korea University alumni
Association football midfielders